Robert Cooley Angell (April 29, 1899 – May 12, 1984) was an American sociologist and educator.  Committed to the advancement of rigorous social scientific research, Angell's work focussed on social integration and the pursuit of a more peaceful world order.  Professor Angell enjoyed the highest honors which his discipline bestowed, presiding over both the American Sociological Society (1951) and the International Sociological Association (1953–1956). As a devoted educator, Angell was instrumental in developing the Honors Program at the University of Michigan, becoming its first director from 1957–1960.

Early and personal life 
Born into a family of educators on April 29, 1899 in Detroit Michigan, he was inquisitive, athletic, academic and devoted to family, especially his beloved sister, Sarah Caswell Angell. Ideas were widely discussed in his household with such relatives as; James Burrill Angell, his grandfather, president of the University of Vermont (1866–1871) and the University of Michigan (1871–1909), James Rowland Angell, his great uncle, a psychologist and president of Yale University (1921–1937), Charles Horton Cooley, his uncle, the renowned sociologist, educator and author as well as his cousin, Constance McLaughlin Green, a Pulitzer Prize-winning historian (1963) and history professor at Smith College. With a family tree full of academics, lawyers, judges, psychologists, sociologists, historians, the Angell household was an intellectually stimulating environment to grow up in.

His summers were spent in Seal Harbor, Maine playing tennis, hiking and sailing—activities he avidly pursued throughout his life. Competitive in nature, Angell loved a challenge and took pleasure in games of all kinds. His laugh was infectious, most often laughing at himself.  Angell suffered with a persistent stammer, and though he worked hard to overcome it, the stuttering continued to plague him. In spite of, or perhaps because of this, Angell was humble, gracious, kind and popular among his peers.

In December 1922, he married Esther Kennedy, University of Michigan class of '22. They had two children, James Kennedy Angell and Sarah Caswell Angell Parsons. The Angell family graciously welcomed faculty members, visiting lecturers, friends and students into their Ann Arbor home where conversation was animated and thought-provoking.

Education 
Angell attended the Liggett School and Central High School, in downtown Detroit. He attended college at The University of Michigan in 1917, earning his B.A. in 1921, M.A. In 1922, and Ph.D. in 1924. His studies were interrupted in 1918, when he enlisted in the U.S. Army Air Service and received a commission as 2nd Lieutenant in May 1919. After graduation from college, he considered following his father, Alexis Caswell Angell, into the practice of law, spending a semester at Harvard Law School.  However, the study of law did not take and Angell returned to study sociology at the University of Michigan. He was appointed Lecturer in 1922 and Assistant Professor of Sociology in 1924 (Sociology was then under the jurisdiction of Economics).  In 1930, Angell became Associate Professor, at the same time, the discipline gained separate departmental status.  In 1935 he became a full Professor of Sociology.

Career 
Dr. Angell served as Chairman of the Sociology Department at the University of Michigan from 1940-1951. During this time he was instrumental in bringing Theodore Newcomb and Ronald Freedman to the department as well as the groups that formed the Survey Research Center and the Research Center for Group Dynamics. 

Angell edited the American Sociological Review from 1946 to 1948.  He was elected President of the American Sociological Association in 1951.  He served abroad as director of UNESCO's Social Science Department in Paris from 1949–1950 heading up a project on world tensions. As a result of this important work, Angell was instrumental in founding the International Sociological Association and served as the organization's second president from 1953–1956. 

Angell served as Director of the University of Michigan Honors Council, initiating a new four-year program for gifted students in the Literary College from 1957–1960, and as Director of the Center for Research on Conflict Resolution (1959), and the Journal of Conflict Resolution (1957) both of which he also helped found.  

Retiring his Professorship in 1969, Dr. Angell continued to teach, mentor and serve the University of Michigan throughout his lifetime. He also stayed physically active, enjoying long walks, playing tennis, and sailing.

Memberships 
 Phi Beta Kappa
 Delta Kappa Epsilon
 Alpha Kappa Delta
 American Sociological Association
 Sociological Research Association
 Michigan Sociological Association
 Research Club
 American Association of University Professors President, International Sociological Association
 American Civil Liberties Union
 U.S. National Commission for UNESCO
 Member of American Delegations to UNESCO General Conferences in Paris in 1952 and in Montevideo in 1954

Military service 
During the time of the World War, Professor Angell was in the middle of his academic career at the University of Michigan. In 1918, Angell entered the U.S. Army Air Service and received commission as 2nd Lieutenant in May 1919. That year, after serving in the Army, he returned to the University and graduated in 1921. Although being a part of the Army frightened Angell, being able to come back and get his degree was extremely important to him. Robert Cooley Angell earned a Bronze Star Medal in 1944 for serving his country.
 1918–1919 Aviation Cadet
 1942–1943 Captain, U.S. Army Air Force
 1943–1944 Major, U.S. Army Air Force
 1944–1945 Lieutenant Colonel, U.S. Army Air Force

Awards 
 Deiches Lecturer, Johns Hopkins University, Spring, 1957
 Faculty Award for Distinguished Achievement, 1958
 Doctor of Humanities, Western Michigan. University, 1967

Publications 
 The Student Mind, Ph.D, University of Michigan, pp. iii + 179. "Report on Methods in the University of Michigan, "(Mimeographed), University of Michigan, pp. 21;published as: "Increasing the Intellectual Interest of Students, "Mich. Alum., 31 (1924-25): 219–20, 230–32, 249, 254–56, 272–75.
 "Student Participation in the Solution of Curricular and Administrative Problems at Michigan, "Christian Ed., 10 (1927): 226-31
 The Campus: A study of Contemporary Undergraduate Life in the American University. New York and London: D. Appleton and Co., 1928, pp. ix + 239
 "The Roots of College Evils, " Forum, 79 (1928) : 419–26.
 "A Study in Undergraduate Adjustment, " Pub. Amer. Sociol. Soc., 23 (1929) : 181–86.
  The Family Encounters The Depression. 1936, Charles Scribner's Sons
  The Integration of American Society: The Study of Groups and Institutions. 1941, McGraw-Hill Publications – Sociology
  The Use of Personal Documents in History, Anthropology and Sociology. 1945, with Louis Gottschalk and Clyde Kluckholn
  The Moral Integration of American Cities. 1951, University of Chicago Press
  Free Society and Moral Crisis. 1958, University of Michigan Press
  Peace on the March. 1969, Van Nostrand Reinhold Company
  The Quest for World Order. 1979, University of Michigan Press

Further reading and external links

</ref>

References 

1899 births
1984 deaths
American sociologists
University of Michigan alumni
University of Michigan faculty
American Sociological Review editors
Presidents of the International Sociological Association